The 1st Curtis Trophy was a Formula Two motor race held on 17 October 1953 at Snetterton Circuit, Norfolk. The race was run over 15 laps of the circuit, and was won by British driver Bob Gerard in a Cooper T23-Bristol, who also set fastest lap. Les Leston in a Cooper T26-JAP and Jimmy Somervail in a Cooper T20-Bristol were second and third.

Results

References

Curtis
Curtis